Krivle-Ilyushkino (Keräwle-İlyuşkin) is a rural locality (a selo) and the administrative centre of Krivle-Ilyushkinsky Selsoviet, Kuyurgazinsky District, Bashkortostan, Russia. The population was 678 as of 2010. There are 4 streets.

Geography 
Krivle-Ilyushkino is located 21 km east of Yermolayevo (the district's administrative centre) by road. Novotroitskaya is the nearest rural locality.

References 

Rural localities in Kuyurgazinsky District